Ghaniabad (also Romanized as Ghanīābād; also known as Ghanīābād-e Pā’īn and Khānīābād) is a village in Ghaniabad Rural District, in the Central District of Ray County, Tehran Province, Iran. At the 2006 census, its population was 1,754, in 441 families.

Notable natives
Navvab Safavi

References 

Populated places in Ray County, Iran